Matlin may refer to:

People
David Matlin (born 1964), director of athletics for the University of Hawaii at Manoa
Joel Matlin, Canadian entrepreneur; president and founder of North American home alarm company AlarmForce
Marlee Matlin (born 1965), American actress, author, and activist

Fictional characters
Katie Matlin, a character from Degrassi: The Next Generation
Maya Matlin, a character from Degrassi: Next Class

Places
Matlin, Utah, ghost town in the northeastern end of the Great Salt Lake Desert, Utah, United States

Other uses
Matlin Patterson Global Advisors, a global distressed securities fund

See also

 
 Mary Matalin (born 1953) U.S. politiican